Bruce Forsyth's Big Night is a TV show screened on ITV on Saturday nights in late 1978. It starred Bruce Forsyth. 12 episodes were broadcast between 7 October and 31 December 1978. Two further one-off specials were shown on 4 April 1980 and 21 September 1980 where Forsyth got the chance to perform an hour long show with idol and long-time friend Sammy Davis Jr, who had been a guest on an earlier show, which Forsyth later said was the best show he'd ever been associated with.

The show was made by London Weekend Television. Following the huge success enjoyed by The Generation Game, Forsyth was poached from the BBC for a reported £15,000 a show with each show having a budget of £250,000. The idea was that the show would provide Bruce with a vehicle for his many and various talents. The show was designed to take up an entire Saturday evening on ITV and win the ratings battle with the BBC. However, it was poorly received and was broadly unsuccessful, with Forsyth's former big hit The Generation Game (hosted then by Larry Grayson) winning higher audiences. The first episode topped the UK television ratings, but episode two didn't feature in the top 20, causing several attempts to revamp the format. Eventually, the show was cut to just 90 minutes in length, including advertisement breaks, and moved to a much earlier Saturday-night slot, but still ratings did not improve. Forsyth claimed in many subsequent on-screen interviews that the retooling did result in an increase in ratings, but this was not borne out by contemporary data.

The show featured some mini-games, like "Beat The Goalie" (a phone-in game with similarities to The Golden Shot) and little games with the studio audience – it also featured mini-comedies, such as a revival of 1960s series The Worker, with Charlie Drake as The Worker and Henry McGee (one of Benny Hill's stooges) as the man at the labour exchange, and also The Glums, a TV adaptation of short sketches from the radio series Take It From Here, with Jimmy Edwards reprising his role he immortalised on radio as Mr Glum, Ian Lavender (Private Pike from Dad's Army) playing the role of Ron (played by Dick Bentley in the radio series) and Patricia Brake as Eth, the role played on radio by June Whitfield. Both those series were eventually made into a full series in their own right, but they were short-lived. The show also featured Cannon and Ball doing their own sketches, but the producer decided to axe their part from the show every single week, as they believed more Bruce was the answer to the problems to the show.

Each show also featured a game of The £1,000 Pyramid, hosted by Steve Jones, which was the first UK adaption of the American game show Pyramid. This show later became a standalone programme on ITV, with Jones remaining as host. In addition, Jones would become one of the hosts of the UK adaptation of Jeopardy!

References

External links

British variety television shows
1978 British television series debuts
1980 British television series endings
1970s British television series
1980s British television series
London Weekend Television shows
Television series by ITV Studios
English-language television shows